Hartsdown Academy is a secondary school with academy status in Margate in southeast England, which teaches years 7-14 (UK school years; age range 11–19 years). It has 1,000 students and 150+ staff.

References

External links
Hartsdown Academy Official site

Secondary schools in Kent
Margate
Academies in Kent